Still Kool is a studio album by the band Kool & the Gang, released in 2007 on New Door Records. The album reached No. 31 on the US Billboard Top Soul Albums chart. Still Kool was certified platinum in France by the SNEP.

Singles
"Dave" reached No. 13 on the US Billboard Top R&B/Hip-Hop Singles Sales chart. "Steppin' into Love" peaked at No. 7 on the Top R&B/Hip-Hop Singles Sales chart and No. 38 on the Billboard Adult R&B Songs chart.

Tracklisting

Certifications

References

2007 albums
Kool & the Gang albums